Moose biathlon is a variation of the winter sport biathlon comprising cross-country skiing, range estimation of paper targets resembling a moose and rifle shooting at a 10 ringed target using fullbore biathlon rifles. Competitions are held by the Finnish Hunters' Association. The sport was developed in Finland in the 1970s, and today competitions are held in Finland and Sweden with a goal to become a Nordic discipline. There are over 10,000 competitors in Sweden and Finland, and over 600 competitors compete at the yearly Finnish Championship.

The skiing is performed classic style over a distance of 7–9 kilometers while carrying the rifle. Competitors under the age of 16 do not have to carry the rifle themselves. The places of range estimation and shooting are located along the ski course. The shooting consists of ten rounds fired from the standing position at a distance of 100 meters, and the rifle must fulfill the legal requirements for hunting moose. In the range estimation part the competitors must judge the distance to two moose figures placed somewhere between 50 and 200 meters.

The winner is determined by a point system, and maximum number of points for the whole competition is 1200.
 The points of the shooting part is calculated by multiplying the target scores by six, giving a maximum of 600 available points.
 The range estimation part has 300 points available, where two points are deducted for each meter of error.
 The fastest competitor in the skiing part is awarded 300 points, while the other competitors are given points based how far they finish behind the fastest skier. One point deducted per 10 second. For example, if a competitor finishes 50 seconds behind the fastest skier he is awarded 295 points from the skiing part of the competition. In most races the oldest competitors will be awarded full skiing points in order to avoid life-threatening illnesses.

There is also a relay race version where each of the team members fire five rounds at a moose target, and estimate the range of one only moose figure instead of two. Penalties apply for missed shots or errors in range estimation.

 is a summer version of moose biathlon where skiing is replaced with a 4-5 kilometer run. Firearm are not carried during running, but are instead placed in a rack near the shooting location.

See also 
 Nordic field biathlon, another Nordic biathlon variant using fullbore rifles.
 Nordic shooting with cross-country running, a summer variant of Nordic field biathlon.
 Biathlon orienteering

References

External links 
 The Finnish Hunting Association - About moose biathlon
 Introduction film by Älvsby Shooting Club (Swedish)
 Information film by Salmonfox (Swedish)
 Hirviurheilu.com - Webpage for match results and upcoming matches for moose biathlon and moose running

Biathlon
Multisports
Cross-country skiing
Racing
Rifle shooting sports
Biathlon in Finland
Moose
Sports originating in Finland